Second-seeded Coral Buttsworth and Marjorie Crawford defeated the fourth seeds Kathleen Le Messurier and Dorothy Weston 6–2, 6–2 in the final, to win the women's doubles tennis title at the 1932 Australian Championships.

Earlier that day both Mrs. Buttsworth and Mrs. Crawford had already won one title each – Women's singles and Mixed Doubles, respectively.

Seeds

 n/a
  Coral Buttsworth /  Marjorie Crawford (champions)
  Frances Hoddle-Wrigley /  Emily Hood Westacott (semifinals)
  Kathleen Le Messurier /  Dorothy Weston (final)

Draw

Draw

Notes

References

External links
  Source for seedings
  Source for the draw.

1932 in Australian tennis
1932 in women's tennis
1932 in Australian women's sport
Women's Doubles